The Bangladesh national cricket team toured South Africa during the 2002–03 season. They played a two-match Test series and a three-match One Day International series against the South Africa national cricket team. South Africa won the Test series 2–0 and the ODI series 3–0.

Squad

Test matches

1st Test

2nd Test

ODI series summary

1st ODI

2nd ODI

3rd ODI

References

External links
 Tour home at ESPNcricinfo
 Bangladesh in South Africa, Sep - Oct 2002-03 at ESPNcricinfo archive
 
 

2002 in South African cricket
South African cricket seasons from 2000–01
2002-03
International cricket competitions in 2002–03
2002 in Bangladeshi cricket